The Coordination of Anarchist Groups (CGA) was a French anarchist organization that split off from the Anarchist Federation at its 60th congress in June 2002. 

In June 2019, the CGA merged with Alternative Libertaire to form the Libertarian Communist Union.

History
The CGA was created mainly by groups from southern France who left the Anarchist Federation (FA) at the organization's 60th congress in June 2002. The split occurred because of their refusal of the practice of unanimity in the decision-making process within the FA, which the CGA considered to be a “source of immobility”, instead favoring a method of decision-making by qualified majority.

However, it still retained links with the Anarchist Federation, with which it collaborated on a joint campaign against participation in the presidential and legislative elections of May-June 2007.

In March 2015, the CGA suffered several defederations following an internal crisis. One of the consequences was that the newspaper Infos et analyzes libertaires ceased to be the organization's press organ, being replaced by the newspaper Résistances libertaires.

In July 2018, it began a process of rapprochement with Alternative Libertaire, with a view to a possible unification. On June 10, 2019, the two organizations merged to create the Libertarian Communist Union.

Publications

References

Bibliography
 
 
 
 

2002 establishments in France
2019 disestablishments in France
Defunct anarchist organizations in France
Organizations established in 2002
Organizations disestablished in 2019